Shawn D. Byram (born September 12, 1968) is a Canadian former ice hockey left winger who played five games in the National Hockey League (NHL) with the New York Islanders and Chicago Blackhawks between the 1990–91 and 1991–92 seasons. The rest of his career, which lasted from 1988 to 2003, was spent in the minor leagues and then in Europe. His son Bowen is also an NHL player.

Playing career
Byram started his hockey career with the Regina Pats of the Western Hockey League. He was later traded to the Prince Albert Raiders.

Byram made his professional debut with the Indianapolis Ice in 1988. In 1991, he made his NHL debut with the New York Islanders of the National Hockey League. Byram played four games with the Islanders in his rookie season, accumulating 14 penalty minutes. On August 15, 1991, Bryam and the Chicago Blackhawks agreed to a one-year deal. Byram remained with the Blackhawks, playing with their IHL affiliate (Indianapolis Ice) until the conclusion of the 1993–94 season.

Byram spent the next eight seasons playing professionally in Europe, spending time in Italy, Austria, and the UK, before returning to the United States in 2002 to play with the Bakersfield Condors of the WCHL. Byram scored 65 points in 68 games, second highest among Falcons players in 2002–03.

Byram retired at the conclusion of the 2002–03 WCHL season.

Personal life
Byram's son, Bowen, was drafted 4th overall in the 2019 NHL Entry Draft by the Colorado Avalanche and currently plays in the NHL. He was an assistant coach during Bo's final season with the Lethbridge Golden Hawks of the Alberta Major Bantam Hockey League (AMBHL) in 2015–16.

Career statistics

Regular season and playoffs

References

External links

1968 births
Living people
Ayr Scottish Eagles players
Bakersfield Condors (1998–2015) players
Bolzano HC players
Bracknell Bees players
Canadian expatriate ice hockey players in England
Canadian expatriate ice hockey players in Italy
Canadian expatriate ice hockey players in Scotland
Canadian expatriate ice hockey players in the United States
Canadian ice hockey centres
Capital District Islanders players
Chicago Blackhawks players
Fresno Falcons players
Ice hockey people from Manitoba
Indianapolis Ice players
Johnstown Chiefs players
Manchester Storm (1995–2002) players
New York Islanders draft picks
New York Islanders players
People from Neepawa, Manitoba
Prince Albert Raiders players
Regina Pats players
Springfield Indians players
Canadian expatriate ice hockey players in Austria